Mound Valley Township is a township in Labette County, Kansas, United States.

References

Townships in Labette County, Kansas
Townships in Kansas